Aiphanes argos is a plant in the family Arecaceae, native to Colombia.

Description
Aiphanes argos grows as a small palm and is a rheophyte (a plant living in swift waters). The pinnae are very long and thin, an adaptation to its environment. Similarly, the stem is flexible and thin.

Distribution and habitat
Aiphanes argos is endemic to Colombia, where it is confined to the canyon of the Samaná Norte River and the river's tributary streams, in Antioquia. At high water on the river, the plant may be entirely submerged.

Conservation
Aiphanes argos has been assessed as critically endangered on the IUCN Red List. The greatest risk to the species is the proposed construction of a hydroelectric power plant and dam on the Samaná Norte River. The dam would submerge most of the species' population in deep waters. Mining activities on the river pose an additional risk to the species' habitat. , the population of Aiphanes argos was estimated at 600. The specific epithet argos refers to Grupo Argos, the company in charge of the dam project.

References

argos
Endemic flora of Colombia
Plants described in 2017